Desulfuromonas michiganensis is a species of tetrachloroethene-reducing, acetate-oxidizing anaerobic bacteria.

References

Further reading

Lee, Patrick Kwan Hon. Molecular and Stable Isotope Analysis of Dehalococcoides Bacteria in Chlorinated Ethene Degrading Communities. ProQuest, 2007.
Stroo, Hans F., Andrea Leeson, and C. Herb Ward, eds. Bioaugmentation for groundwater remediation. Vol. 5. Springer, 2012.
Zhou, Jing. The development of molecular tools for the evaluation of the bioremediation of chlorinated solvents. ProQuest, 2008.

External links
 LPSN
Type strain of Desulfuromonas michiganensis at BacDive -  the Bacterial Diversity Metadatabase

Desulfuromonadales
Bacteria described in 2009